Stand Clear of the Closing Doors is a 2013 drama film directed by Sam Fleischner. The story is about an autistic child named Ricky who, after a particularly difficult day at school, escapes into the New York City Subway. It was shown in the main competition section of the 2013 Deauville American Film Festival, where it won Prix du Jury (Jury Special Prize) of the festival.

References

External links

American drama films
2013 films
2013 drama films
2010s American films
Films about autism